"Hold On to Me" is a song performed by American contemporary Christian singer and songwriter Lauren Daigle. The song was released on February 26, 2021, as the lead single to her upcoming project. Daigle co-wrote the song with Paul Duncan and Paul Mabury. Paul Mabury worked on the production of the single.

"Hold On to Me" is Lauren Daigle's fifth No. 1 song on the US Hot Christian Songs chart. The song also went on to peak at No. 15 on the Bubbling Under Hot 100 chart. "Hold On to Me" received nominations for the Pop/Contemporary Recorded Song of the Year, and Short Form Video of the Year at the 2021 GMA Dove Awards. At the 2022 GMA Dove Awards, the song also received a GMA Dove Award nomination for Song of the Year.

Background
On February 1, 2021, Lauren Daigle announced that she would be releasing a new single titled "Hold On to Me" on February 26, 2021.  "Hold On to Me" was released on February 26, 2021, accompanied by an audio video of the song on YouTube. Daigle also revealed that the song was the "first taste" of an upcoming project.

Writing and development
Daigle began writing "Hold On to Me" with Paul Duncan and Paul Mabury, while she was on tour, having songwriting sessions between tour stops in Wichita, Kansas and Phoenix, Arizona. She first performed the song while on tour in Wichita.

Composition
Daigle's vocal range spans from G3 to A4 during the song.

Accolades

Commercial performance
"Hold On to Me" debuted on the Christian Airplay chart at number 25 dated March 6, 2021. The following week, it debuted at No. 3 on the Hot Christian Songs, after logging in its first full week of sales and streams. The song concurrently debuted on the Bubbling Under Hot 100 chart dated March 13, 2021, at No. 15.

"Hold On to Me" reached No. 1 on the Hot Christian Songs chart dated June 5, 2021, following to the surge in downloads after Lauren Daigle's performance of the song on the season finale of NBC's The Voice.

Music video
The official audio video of "Hold On to Me" showcasing the single's artwork was released to YouTube on February 26, 2021. On March 11, 2021, Daigle released the music video of the song.

Track listing

Credits and personnel
Credits adapted from Tidal.
 Lauren Daigle – composition, vocals
 Paul Duncan – composition
 Mark Endert – mixing
 Joe LaPorta – mastering
 Paul Mabury – composition, production

Charts

Weekly charts

Year-end charts

Certifications

Release history

References

External links
  on PraiseCharts

2021 singles
2021 songs
Lauren Daigle songs